Bhavadhaarini Anantaraman (born 25 July 1980) is a Carnatic musician. She is a senior disciple of D. K. Pattammal. She has performed in all major sabhas in India and has presented her concerts in many destinations around the world. She has received multiple awards and honours and has released more than 50 commercial albums.

Bhavadhaarini was born to Nalini Anantaraman and S.Anantaraman. Her mother was her first guru. Nalini Anantaraman was a vainika and a vocalist trained under D.K.Pattammal.

Bhavadhaarini has sung in major sabhas in India.

Bhavadhaarini has performed in all major sabhas all over India and has presented her concerts in the United States of America, Sri Lanka, Singapore, Nigeria and various other destinations throughout the world. Bhavadhaarini's commanding voice is well suited to various genres of music including Carnatic music and devotional music.

Achievements 

 Recipient of the Spic Scholarship for three years.
 Recipient of Sterling Holidays Scholarship for Vocal Music.
 Recipient of the CCRT fellowship (Center for Cultural Resource and Talent) from the Ministry of Culture, Government of India.
 ‘A’ grade artist of All India Radio’ Chennai in 2002.
 She received the ‘Sivaji Birudhu’ in 2009 in appreciation of her work in the field of Carnatic Music and Devotional Music.

References 

 Patrika Online Interview
 CD released
 Concert Review
 Concert in Boston
 Concert In Boston

Living people
Performers of Hindu music
Women Carnatic singers
Carnatic singers
1980 births
People from Thanjavur
Singers from Tamil Nadu
Women musicians from Tamil Nadu
21st-century Indian women singers
21st-century Indian singers